Melica animarum is a species of grass that is endemic to Sierra de las Ánimas in Uruguay.

Description
Their apex is acute and their margins are ciliated.

Spikelets are solitary and obovate with fertile spikelets being pedicelled, pedicels of which are ciliated, curved, and filiform. The spikelets have two fertile florets which are diminished at the apex. The bottom of the upper glume is scabrous while the lower glume bottom is either asperulous or smooth with a rough top. The lower glume by itself is elliptic just like lemma, with an erose apex.

Paleas keels are ciliated and adorned. Flowers are fleshy, oblong, truncate, and grow together.

Ecology
Melica animarum can be found growing in dark soils and in stones. The flowers bloom only in November.

References

animarum
Flora of Uruguay